Byron is a crater on Mercury. It has a diameter of 106.58 kilometers. Its name was adopted by the International Astronomical Union (IAU) in 1976. Byron is named for the English poet Lord Byron, who lived from 1788 to 1824.

References

Impact craters on Mercury
Lord Byron